Sir Sebag Shaw  (26 December 1906– 27 December 1982) was a British barrister and judge.

Sebag Sochaczewski (later Shaw) was born in East London to Chaim Sochaczewski (later naturalised as 'Henry Shaw'; of Polish origin), owner of a photographic studio, and Marie (née Baumgart), and educated at Central Foundation Boys' School and University College London (LL.B). In his youth he had suffered a severe attack of polio, which left him with a pronounced limp, nevertheless becoming a skilled swimmer, rower and horseman. He was called 'Sib' by family and friends. In 1928, he married Sally, daughter of Oscar Baumgart. He was called to the Bar from Gray's Inn in 1931, appointed Q.C. in 1967, and Bencher of Gray's Inn that same year, being later Leader of the South Eastern Circuit. Shaw served from 1958 to 1968 as Honorary Recorder of Ipswich, succeeding Sir Stephen Gerald Howard, QC, MP (1947–1958). Shaw was succeeded by the Hon. William McLaren Howard, QC.

Notable cases
In 1955 Shaw was junior counsel to Aubrey Melford Stevenson for the defence in the trial of Ruth Ellis; she was the last woman hanged in the United Kingdom.

Further career
Knighted in 1968, Shaw was appointed a High Court judge and promoted to be a Lord Justice of Appeal in 1975; he served in this capacity until his death. He chaired the Justice Annual members conference in 1973. Shaw was a Member of the Bar Council from 1964 to 1968, and of the Parole Board from 1971 to 1974 (Vice-Chairman 1973–4).

Along with Judge Dennis Smith, Shaw wrote the seminal text The Law of Meetings, which went through five editions over thirty years.

References

1906 births
1982 deaths
English barristers
English Jews
Lords Justices of Appeal
Members of Gray's Inn
Knights Bachelor
Members of the Privy Council of the United Kingdom
People from Ipswich
20th-century King's Counsel
English King's Counsel
Queen's Bench Division judges
20th-century English lawyers